Nikki Hiltz (born October 23, 1994) is a mid-distance runner from Aptos, California. Hiltz attended Aptos High School, where in  2012 they won the CIF California State Championship in the 1600 meters. Hiltz is a 6 time NCAA Division I All-American. Hiltz is openly gay, and came out as transgender and nonbinary on International Transgender Day of Visibility, March 31, 2021.

High school
Hiltz won 6 California Interscholastic Federation (CIF) Central Coast Section titles while attending Aptos High School.
Their 6 titles: [2011 — 1600 m (4:51.94), 800 m (2:12.65)] [2012 — 1600 m (4:51.89), 800 m (2:10.10)] [2013 — 1600 m (4:44.93), 800 m (2:09.50)]

While attending Aptos Middle School, Hiltz ran a 400 m in 1:07.41 (2009), an 800 m in 2:51.54 (2008), a high jump of 1.37 m (2009), and long jump of 3.94 m (2008).

High school personal bests

University (Oregon / Arkansas)
Hiltz is a 6 time NCAA Division I All-American. They began their college career at Oregon in 2014 before transferring to Arkansas in 2016.

At the 2015 NCAA Division I Indoor Track and Field Championships Hiltz finished in 8th place with a time of 4:38.47 in the mile for the Oregon Ducks.

Hiltz was a 2015 NCAA Division 1 & Pac-12 Conference Track and Field Team Champion as a member of the Oregon Ducks at the 2015 NCAA Division I Outdoor Track and Field Championships.

After the 2015 season, Hiltz transferred to Arkansas. In 2016 Hiltz, along with Arkansas Razorbacks teammates Daina Harper, Therese Haiss and Jessica Kamilos, placed 5th in the DMR (Distance Medley Relay) with a time of 10:59.22 at the 2016 NCAA Division I Indoor Track and Field Championships.

Hiltz placed 6th in the mile, finishing with a time of 4:34.57 at the 2017 NCAA Division I Indoor Track and Field Championships.

In 2018, they earned First Team NCAA Division I All-America honors in the 1500m Outdoors at the 2018 NCAA Division I Outdoor Track and Field Championships for the Arkansas Razorbacks. They also placed 3rd in the mile at the 2018 NCAA Division I Indoor Track and Field Championships.

University personal bests

Professional

2018
In 2018, Hiltz signed with Adidas and trained with The Mission Athletics Club, now known as The Golden Coast Track Club based in California after running a 1500 m time ranked in the top 100 in the world. In January of the same year they ran a then-personal best 2:05.16 in the 800 m. Later in the year Hiltz ran the Aetna Falmouth Mile placing 4th in 4:32.29. They followed up with a 5th place finish at the Memphis Ed Murphey Mile with a time of 4:32.59. They also ran the Bay Shore Hoka One Long Island Mile placing 12th in 4:39.23. Hiltz ranked 92nd in the world in the 1500 m with a personal best of 4:09.14.

2019
Hiltz ran an indoor 3000 m (9:04.32) at the JDL Fast Track Invitational, won the indoor mile (4:31.42) at the Husky Classic, and at the 2019 USA Track & Field Indoor Championships placed 5th in the mile (4:32.40) and 15th in the 2 mile (9:55.50).

Hiltz won the 800 m (2:01.37) at the 2019 Bryan Clay Invitational, won the 1500 m (4:07.71) at the 2019 USATF Distance Classic, runner-up in the 1500 m (4:05.56) at 2019 Portland Track Festival, won the 800 m (2:02.93) at the 2019 Adrian Martinez Classic, won the 1500 m (4:05.97) at the 2019 Sunset Tour. They also placed 3rd in the 1500 m (4:03.55) at the 2019 USA Outdoor Track and Field Championships. Hiltz ranked 19th in the world in the 1500 m with a personal best of 4:01.52 in the semi-finals of the 2019 World Athletics Championships.

2020
Hiltz ran the mile at the Millrose Games in 4:24.45, splitting a 1500 m time of 4:07.09 and placing 5th with an indoor personal best.

Race director
In 2020, Hiltz organized Virtual Pride 5k races and donated proceeds to the Trevor Project, a non-profit organization founded in 1998 focused on suicide prevention efforts among LGBTQ youth. Thousands of people supported the race.

2021
In New York, Hiltz competed in the 1500 m at New Balance Indoor Grand Prix.

2022
In the summer of 2022, no longer sponsored by Adidas, Hiltz announced that she signed with LuluLemon.  September 11th, Hiltz finished 2nd at 2022 New Balance New York Road Runners Fifth Avenue Mile in 4:17.4 behind winner Laura Muir.

Personal bests

Competition record

International competitions

Domestic competitions

References

External links
 Nikki Hiltz's Aptos High School results
 
 
 Nikki Hiltz's University of Arkansas official Track profile
 
 

1994 births
Living people
American female long-distance runners
American female middle-distance runners
Sportspeople from California
Track and field athletes from California
University of Arkansas alumni
Lesbian sportswomen
LGBT people from California
American LGBT sportspeople
LGBT track and field athletes
Transgender non-binary people
Non-binary sportspeople
Athletes (track and field) at the 2019 Pan American Games
Pan American Games gold medalists for the United States
Pan American Games medalists in athletics (track and field)
Pan American Games track and field athletes for the United States
Oregon Ducks women's track and field athletes
Arkansas Razorbacks women's track and field athletes
Pan American Games gold medalists in athletics (track and field)
Medalists at the 2019 Pan American Games
Transgender sportspeople